Sultana is a genus of air-breathing land snails, terrestrial pulmonate gastropod mollusks in the family Orthalicidae.

Species 
Species in the genus Sultana include:
 Sultana atramentaria (L. Pfeiffer, 1855)
 Sultana augusti (Jousseaume, 1887)
 Sultana deburghiae (Reeve, 1859)
 Sultana elizabethae Ahuir & Torres, 2019
 Sultana fraseri (Pfeiffer, 1860)
 Sultana hidalgoi Vega-Luz, 2021
 Sultana kelletti (Reeve, 1850)
 Sultana labeo (Broderip, 1828)
 Sultana liae Vega-Luz, 2021
 Sultana macandrewi (G. B. Sowerby III, 1889)
 Sultana maranhonensis (Albers, 1854)
 Sultana meobambensis (Pfeiffer, 1855)
 Sultana powisiana (Petit de la Saussaye, 1843)
 Sultana shuttleworthi (Albers, 1854)
 Sultana sultana (Dillwyn, 1817)
 Sultana wrzeesniowskii (Lubomirski, 1880)
 Sultana yatesi (L. Pfeiffer, 1855)

References

 Pilsbry, H.A. (1899). Bulimulidae. In: Tryon, G.W. Manual of Conchology, (2) 12: 1-258, pls. 1-64. Philadelphia

External links
 Shuttleworth, R. J. (1856). Beiträge zur näheren Kenntniss der Mollusken. Notitiae Malacologicae. 1: 1-90, pls 1-9
 Strebel H. (1909). Revision der Unterfamilie der Orthalicinen. Jahrbuch der Hamburgischen Wissenschaftlichen Anstalten. 26 (Beiheft 2): 191 pp, 23 pl.
 Breure et al., Synopsis of Central Andean Orthalicoid land snails (Gastropoda, Stylommatophora), excluding Bulimulidae; Zookeys. 2016; (588): 1–199

Orthalicidae